The white-chinned myzomela (Myzomela albigula) is a species of bird in the family Meliphagidae.
It is found in the Louisiade Archipelago.

References

Myzomela
Birds of the Louisiade Archipelago
Birds described in 1898
Taxonomy articles created by Polbot